Stac Lee is a sea stack in the St Kilda group off the west coast of Scotland. An island Marilyn (a point with topographic prominence of at least 150 m), it is home to part of the world's largest colony of northern gannet.

Martin Martin called the island "Stac-Ly" in 1698. Other sources call it "Stac Lii."

Geography and geology
Stac Lee is located in the North Atlantic and forms part of the St Kilda archipelago of the Outer Hebrides.

Administratively, Stac Lee is part of the Na h-Eileanan Siar.

Topography and ascents

The nearby Stac an Armin reaches , making these the highest sea stacks in Britain. Seen from the south, the rock appears as an imposing cliff as broad as high, while from the west it has the aspect of a thin needle with a top bevelled at an angle of 45°. The most impressive view is that obtained from the south-east, from where Stac Lee looks like a giant hook.

A small bothy on Stac Lee was formerly used by St Kildan fowlers. It is big enough to accommodate two people and is dry inside. The St Kildans would land here by lassoing an iron peg, and then jumping when the swell rose up.

Along with his sister Evelyn, Norman Heathcote climbed the stack in 1899 and wrote about it in his book St Kilda and in a climbing journal.

It was climbed on 21 May 1990 by three National Trust for Scotland wardens. Its summit was reached by six climbers, including Marilyn baggers and supporting rock climbers, on 13 October 2014. There were more ascents in October 2015.

Wildlife
St Kilda has the world's largest colony of northern gannet, with an estimated 60,000 breeding pairs on Boreray, Stac an Armin and Stac Lee. In 2004 about 14,000 occupied nest sites were observed on Stac Lee alone and this number is thought to have been stable over the previous ten years.

Gallery

See also

 List of islands of Scotland
 List of outlying islands of Scotland

Footnotes

St Kilda, Scotland
Marilyns of Scotland
Mountains and hills of the Scottish islands
Mountains and hills of the Outer Hebrides
Stacks of Scotland
Seabird colonies
Uninhabited islands of the Outer Hebrides